Timothy Horner (born August 19, 1959) is a retired professional wrestler, best known as Tim "White Lightning" Horner, one half of The Lightning Express with Brad Armstrong.

Professional wrestling career

Early career (1978–1988) 
Tim Horner started wrestling in 1978 in the Alabama territory.

Jim Crockett Promotions (1984–1988) 

Horner signed to Jim Crockett Promotions in 1984, and formed The Lightning Express with Brad Armstrong. They won the Universal Wrestling Federation tag team title in 1987, defeating Sting and Rick Steiner. They also won the National Wrestling Alliance's National Tag Team title.

World Wrestling Federation (1988–1989)
Tim Horner signed with WWF in late 1988 and left in late 1989. On televised matches he was used as a jobber in both singles and tag-team matches, while at house shows he was frequently victorious over other jobbers including Danny Davis, Jose Estrada, Barry Horowitz, Jose Luis Rivera, Iron Mike Sharpe, Tom Magee, Steve Lombardi, and Johnny K-9 (Taras Bulba).

World Championship Wrestling / Smoky Mountain Wrestling (1990–1995)
In the 1990s, Horner wrestled for World Championship Wrestling as the masked "Star Blazer", and for Smoky Mountain Wrestling (SMW). In SMW, he also played the original "Kendo the Samurai" (a masked samurai gimmick, also used by Scott Antol, Brian Logan, Dave Pillman and others) managed by Daryl Van Horne.

Late career 
After WCW, he occasionally wrestled on independent shows in Georgia and Tennessee. He then worked in World Wrestling Entertainment as a producer for its SmackDown! brand, until October 26, 2006. On June 16, 2013, he teamed with Tom Prichard to defeat Bob Orton, Jr. and George South at the Brad Armstrong Memorial Event.

Political career 
On May 1, 2018, he was elected County Commissioner in Hamblen County, Tennessee.

Championships and accomplishments
All-Pro Wrestling
APW Tag Team Championship (1 time) - with Keith Hart
Georgia Championship Wrestling
NWA National Tag Team Championship (1 time) - with Brad Armstrong
Independent International Wrestling Association
IIWA Tag Team Championship (1 time) – with Chick Donovan
Mid-Atlantic Wrestling Alliance
MAWA Tag Team Championship (1 time) – with Road Warrior Hawk
National Championship Wrestling
NCW Tag Team Championship (1 time) - with Jeff Tankersley
Southeastern Championship Wrestling
NWA Southeast United States Junior Heavyweight Championship (5 times)
Smokey Mountain Wrestling
SMW Beat the Champ Television Championship (3 times)
SMW World Fax Machine Champion (1st and final)
SMW Used Truck Winner (1st and final)
Southern States Wrestling
Kingsport Wrestling Hall of Fame (Class of 2002)
Tennessee Mountain Wrestling
TMW Tag Team Championship (1 time) - with Ron Garvin
United Atlantic Championship Wrestling
UACW Heavyweight Championship (1 time)
UACW Tag Team Championship (1 time) - with Jimmy Golden
Universal Wrestling Federation
UWF World Tag Team Championship (1 time) - with Brad Armstrong
WWE
WWE Hall of Fame  ( RUMORED)

References

External links 
 

1959 births
American male professional wrestlers
Living people
Masked wrestlers
People from Morristown, Tennessee
Professional wrestlers from Tennessee
20th-century professional wrestlers
21st-century professional wrestlers
SMW Beat the Champ Television Champions
NWA National Tag Team Champions